Shri Hoping Stone Lyngdoh (15 March 1929 – 26 September 2015) was an Indian politician who was the president of the Hill State People's Democratic Party (HSPDP), one of three official political parties of the state of Meghalaya in India.
He was the son of late Hajur Shon; was born at Nonglait Village, West Khasi Hills District on March 15, 1929; he studied at St. Anthony's College, Shillong.

Beside the political arena, he was an agriculturist, school teacher and social worker; he was the president of the Hill State People's Democratic Party, previously associated with the Eastern India Tribal Union since 1957, it was renamed  All-Party Hill Leaders Conference in 1960. He was also a member of United Khasi Jaintia Hills Autonomous District Council, 1957 to 1972, also member of the Assam Legislative Assembly (1962—68) and the Meghalaya Legislative Assembly (1972—2015).

He was the oldest serving representative member in Meghalaya and has never been defeated in a legislative assembly election. For a brief period he also was a Member of Parliament, 1977.
He was actively associated with educational organisations and their programmes, also fought single-handedly against uranium mining in the State.

The 86-year-old veteran and most decorated politician of his time, Mr. Lyngdoh, who represented Nongstoin constituency of West Khasi Hills district in the Assembly, died on September 26, 2015, at the Northeast Indira Gandhi Regional Institute of Medical and Health Sciences (Neighrims) in Shillong. He died of pneumonia, sepsis and multiple organ failure. He was buried at Mawkyllei village in West Khasi Hills District of Meghalaya.

References

External links 
 "HSPDP calls for public support for Khasi -Jaintia cause ", North East Tribune, January 9, 2006. Accessed February 3, 2006.
 "Meghalaya takes it easy on Domiasiat", The Telegraph, Calcutta, India, October 21, 2004. Accessed February 3, 2006.

1929 births
2015 deaths
Meghalaya politicians
People from West Khasi Hills district
Assam MLAs 1962–1967
Assam MLAs 1967–1972
Meghalaya MLAs 1972–1978
India MPs 1977–1979
Lok Sabha members from Meghalaya
Meghalaya MLAs 1978–1983
Meghalaya MLAs 1983–1988
Meghalaya MLAs 1988–1993
Meghalaya MLAs 1993–1998
Meghalaya MLAs 1998–2003
Meghalaya MLAs 2003–2008
Meghalaya MLAs 2008–2013
Meghalaya MLAs 2013–2018
Deaths from pneumonia in India
Hill State People's Democratic Party politicians